Bela is a town in Northern Croatia.

References

Populated places in Varaždin County